The 2017 Saudi Crown Prince Cup Final was the 42nd and last final of the Crown Prince Cup. It took place on 10 March 2017 at the King Fahd International Stadium in Riyadh, Saudi Arabia and was contested between Al-Ittihad and Al-Nassr. It was Al-Ittihad's 12th Crown Prince Cup final and first since 2007 and Al-Nassr's 7th final. This was the second meeting between these two clubs in the final with Al-Ittihad winning in 1991.

Al-Ittihad won the match 1–0 and secured their 8th Crown Prince Cup title.

Teams

Venue

On 27 January 2015, the King Fahd International Stadium was announced as the host of the final venue. This was the 15th Crown Prince Cup final hosted in the King Fahd International Stadium following those in 1992, 1994, 1998, 2003, 2004, 2005, 2006, 2008, 2009, 2010, 2012, 2013, 2014, 2015 and 2016.

The King Fahd International Stadium was built in 1982 and was opened in 1987. The stadium was used as a venue for the 1992, 1995, and the 1997 editions of the FIFA Confederations Cup. Its current capacity is 68,752 and it is used by the Saudi Arabia national football team, Al-Nassr, Al-Shabab, and major domestic matches.

Background
Al-Ittihad reached their 12th final after a 3–2 win against derby rivals Al-Ahli. This was Al-Ittihad's first final since 2007. Previously, they won finals in 1958, 1959, 1963, 1991, 1997, 2001, and 2004, and lost in 1965, 1993, 2002 and 2007.

Al-Nassr reached their seventh final, after a 2–0 win against derby rivals and title holdersAl-Hilal. They reached their first final since 2014. Previously, they won finals in 1973, 1974, and 2014, and lost in 1991, 1996, and 2013. This was the first final since 2001 that did not feature either Al-Ahli or Al-Hilal.

The two teams played each other once in the season prior to the final. The match ended in a 1–0 win for Al-Nassr.

Road to the final 

Key: (H) = Home; (A) = Away

Match

Details

{| width="100%"
|valign="top" width="40%"|

Statistics

See also

 2016–17 Saudi Crown Prince Cup
 2016–17 Saudi Professional League
 2017 King Cup

References

External links

Sports competitions in Saudi Arabia
March 2017 sports events in Asia
Ittihad FC matches
Al Nassr FC matches